Serena Nanda is an American author, anthropologist, and professor emeritus. She received the Ruth Benedict Prize in 1990 for her monograph, Neither Man nor Woman: The Hijras of India.

Biography
Serena Nanda was born on August 13, 1938 in New York City and received her PhD in anthropology from New York University. She is the co-author of two anthropology textbooks: Culture Counts: A Concise Introduction to Cultural Anthropology (5th Edition) and Cultural Anthropology (12th edition). Among her areas of specialty was the topic of gender diversity, having written the major reference book on the hijras of India.  As of August 2021, she was a professor emeritus at the John Jay College of Criminal Justice.

Awards
 1990, Ruth Benedict Prize, Neither Man nor Woman: The Hijras of India

Selected works 
 Urban Systems Analysis: An Anthropological Perspective, 1971
 Social honor and informal social relationships : a study of kinship, friendship and neighbor relations in Bombay, India, 1973
 Teaching Nonanthropology Majors, 1979
 Cultural Anthropology. Van Nostrand, New York, New York, 1980, .
 More Dialogue on the "Bloodthirsty" Semai, 1988
 Neither Man nor Woman. The Hijras of India. Wadsworth, Belmont, California, 1990, .
 American Cultural Pluralism and Law: An Innovative Interdisciplinary Course, 1990
 Getting away with murder: Cultural diversity and the criminal justice system, 1994
 Trouble in paradise: Native Hawaiians V. The United States of America, 1996
 Goes With Everything, 1999
 Gender Diversity: Crosscultural Variations., 2000, Long Grove, IL: Waveland Press, Inc. .
 North American Indian Jewelry and Adornment: From Prehistory to the Present , 2002
 Seeing Ourselves as Others See Us: Perceptions and Representations of “the West” by Other Peoples of the World , 2003
 South African Museums and the Creation of a New National Identity, 2004
 with Joan Gregg and Beth Pacheco: 40 Perfect New York Days. Walks and Rambles in and around the City. iUniverse, New York, New York, 2004, .
 Arranging a marriage in India, 2006
 The gift of a bride : a tale of anthropology, matrimony, and murder, 2009
 Assisted dying : an ethnographic murder mystery on Florida's gold coast, 2011
 Motivating New Students, 2012
 Gender diversity : crosscultural variations, second edition, 2014, Long Grove, IL: Waveland Press, Inc. .
 Culture counts : a concise introduction to cultural anthropology, 2015
 Love and marriage : cultural diversity in a changing world, 2019, Long Grove, IL: Waveland Press, Inc. .

References

Living people
1938 births
People from New York City
American anthropologists
American anthropology writers
20th-century American writers
20th-century American women writers
21st-century American writers
21st-century American women writers
City University of New York faculty
Gender studies academics